Tade or Tadé may refer to the following people

Given name 
Tadeusz Fuss-Kaden (1914–1985), Polish painter 
Tade Adepoyibi, Australian actress
Tade Ipadeola (born 1970), Nigerian poet 
Tade Ogidan (born 1960), Nigerian film and television screenwriter, producer and director
Tade Thompson, British-born Nigerian psychiatrist and science fiction writer

Surname 
Clarence Tade (1883–1961), Canadian politician
Emiliano Tade (born 1988), Argentinean football player
Grégory Tadé (born 1986), French football player 
Marco Tadé (born 1995), Swiss skier